Palaquium sericeum is a tree in the family Sapotaceae. The specific epithet sericeum means "silky", referring to the indumentum.

Description
The bark is reddish brown. Inflorescences bear up to 20 flowers.

Distribution and habitat
Palaquium sericeum is endemic to Borneo. Its habitat is forests, primarily mixed dipterocarp forest.

References

sericeum
Endemic flora of Borneo
Trees of Borneo
Plants described in 1925